Mary Ellen is a given name. Notable people with the name include:

 Mary Ellen Duncan (died 2022), American academic administrator and teacher
 Mary Ellen Mark (1940–2015), American photographer
 Mary Ellen Pleasant (1815–1904), American entrepreneur, financier, real estate magnate, and abolitionist
 Mary Ellen Wilson (1864–1956), American child abuse victim